The Youth Front (FdG) was the youth wing of the Italian Social Movement since 1971.

History

At the beginning of the 70s Massimo Anderson and Pietro Cerullo, brought together the main right-wing youth movements of the time, namely the Young Italy and the "Students and Workers Youth Rally", in a new political entity called "Youth Front", with Anderson as secretary and Cerullo as president. The national council of the FdG took office on 6 September 1971.

As for many other organizations of the time that did not have a political line based solely on the institutional sphere, the Youth Front measured itself against the political violence that marked the so-called "Years of Lead". The violent dimension of the political clash that involved the militants of the FdG with the opposing political forces, in particular those of the extra-parliamentary Left, caused the death of many activists on the right and left, including the militants of the FdG militants killed in the Acca Larentia massacre.

In 1996, after the transformation of the Italian Social Movement into National Alliance, the Youth Front also changed its name and became Youth Action.

National secretaries
Massimo Anderson (1971–1977)
Franco Petronio (regent) (1977)
Gianfranco Fini (1977–1988)
Gianni Alemanno (1988–1991)
Riccardo Andriani (1991–1993)
Giuseppe Scopelliti (1993–1995)
Regency Committee  (1995–1996)
Basilio Catanoso (1996)

See also
 Groupe Union Défense
 Federation of Nationalist Students

References

1971 establishments in Italy
1996 disestablishments in Italy
Youth wings of political parties in Italy
Neo-fascist organisations in Italy
Youth wings of fascist parties